Fausto Heriberto Cayambe Tipan (June 24, 1976 – October 30, 2016) was an Ecuadorian politician.

References

1976 births
2016 deaths
PAIS Alliance politicians